Events in the year 1904 in Norway.

Incumbents
Monarch – Oscar II
Prime Minister – Francis Hagerup

Events
 23 January – Ålesund Fire:  a major fire break out during the night in the town of Ålesund. The fire destroyed almost the whole city centre, built mostly of wood like the majority of Norwegian towns in that era. The Fire left nearly 10,000 people homeless.
 22 March – the profession of attorney was opened for women; Elise Sem opened an attorney's office as the first woman in Europe
 28 June – The Danish ocean liner SS Norge runs aground and sinks close to Rockall, killing 635, including 225 Norwegian emigrants
 1 November – The Flekkefjord Line is opened.

Popular culture

Sports

Music 

December – Adolf Østbye, revue artist, made the first gramophone record in Norway

Film

Literature

Notable births
20 January – Alf Pedersen, boxer (died 1925)
22 January – Berge Helle Kringlebotn, politician (died 1992)
4 February – Werner Nilsen, soccer player in America (died 1992)
7 March – Ivar Ballangrud, speed skater and multiple Olympic gold medallist (died 1969)
14 March – Olav Rasmussen Langeland, politician (died 1981)
16 March – Arne Holst, bobsledder (died 1991)
9 April – Carl Viggo Manthey Lange, politician (died 1999)
24 April – Ragnvald Skrede, author, journalist, literature critic and translator (died 1983)
6 May – Magnhild Hagelia, politician (died 1996)
31 May – Thor Thorvaldsen, sailor and twice Olympic gold medallist (died 1987)
2 June – Harald Johan Løbak, politician and Minister (died 1985)
4 June – Aase Bye, actress (died 1991)
15 June – Trond Halvorsen Wirstad, politician (died 1985)
22 June – Lars Fletre, sculptor (died 1977)
29 June – Olav Tendeland, lawyer and sports administrator.
2 July – Alf Grindrud, politician (died 1959)
14 July – Reidar Andreas Lyseth, politician (died 1987)
17 July – Henrik Svensen, politician (died 2007)
21 July – Henry Johansen, international soccer player (died 1988)
15 August – Bjarne Henry Henriksen, politician (died 1995)
5 September – Anders Lange, politician (died 1974)
7 September – Ragnar Steen, musician and band-leader (died 1958)
11 September – Olav Totland, politician (died 1996)
13 September – Sivert Todal, politician (died 1988)
16 September – Vebjørn Tandberg, businessperson and industrialist (died 1978)
17 September – Christen Christensen, pair skater (died 1969)
4 October – Petter Carl Reinsnes, politician (died 1976)
8 October – Helga Stene, educator (died 1983).
15 October – Paul Ingebretsen, politician (died 1968)
29 October – Randi Bakke, pair skater (died 1984)
17 December – Ole Johansen, politician (died 1986)

Full date unknown
Sigurd Anderson, nineteenth Governor of South Dakota (died 1990)
Reidar Kjellberg, art historian (died 1978)
Axel Heiberg Stang, politician and Minister (died 1974)
Paulus Svendsen, historian of literature and ideas (died 1989)
Eirik Vandvik, professor in literature (died 1953)
Kolbjørn Varmann, politician and Minister (died 1980)

Notable deaths

3 May – Tycho Kielland, jurist and journalist (born 1854)
18 August – Sivert Andreas Nielsen, politician (born 1823)

Full date unknown
Jacob Aall Bonnevie, politician and Minister (born 1838)
Hans Gløersen, forest manager and lawyer (born 1836)
Johan Christian Heuch, bishop and politician (born 1838)
Ole Anton Qvam, politician and Minister (born 1834)

See also

References

1902